The Adra massacre was the killing of at least 32 Alawite, Christian, Druze and Ismailite civilians in the industrial town of Adra, Syria in December 2013, during the Syrian Civil War. According to the government and activists it was conducted by the al-Nusra Front. The U.S. State Department condemned massacres in Syria and condemned 'the latest report of a massacre of civilians in Adra.'

On 11 December, the rebel Islamic Front, Jaish al-Islam and Al-Nusra Front groups infiltrated the industrial area of the town of Adra, northeast of Damascus, attacking buildings housing workers and their families. The fighters were reported to have targeted Alawites, Druze, Christians and Shiites, killing them for sectarian motives. Some people were shot while others were beheaded. The killings lasted into the next day. 15–19 minority civilian deaths were documented by the Syrian Observatory for Human Rights, amidst claims that as many as 40 were killed and many families abducted.<ref  18 pro-government militia were also killed, including five Palestinian Liberation Army (PLA) members. Several rebels died when a Shiite man detonated a hand grenade, killing himself, the rebels and members of his family, after the rebels attempted to kill them.

On 13 December, the military surrounded Adra and started an operation to push out rebel fighters from the area, making advances in the town during the day. As of the next day, the operation was still continuing.

By 15 December, the number of minority civilians confirmed killed in the rebel attack on Adra had risen to 32. Dozens of others were missing. The Syrian military claimed more than 80 people were killed by Islamic rebels, while the Syrian Foreign Ministry put out a figure of more than 100 dead.

On 30 December, reports said that the Syrian army evacuated around 5,000 people from Adra, while on 31 December, the government news agency reported that more people were evacuated, bringing the total number of evacuees to more than 6,000.

By mid-January, the Syrian government had reportedly regained control of the industrial area of Adra. In late September 2014, the Army recaptured the town.

See also
List of massacres during the Syrian Civil War

References

Massacres of the Syrian civil war in 2013
Rif Dimashq Governorate in the Syrian civil war
Persecution of Alawites
Violence against Shia Muslims in Syria
Persecution of Druze by Muslims
Massacres of the Syrian civil war perpetrated by the al-Nusra Front
Syrian Ismailis
History of Christianity in Syria